Viswa Bharathi English Medium High School (VBEMHS) is a high school in Gudivada, Andhra Pradesh, India. It was established in 1968 as Viswa Bharathi Vidya Niketan and provided instruction in Telugu.  English instruction began in 1985. The school's Chairman is Sreemannarayana Potluri.

About 3000 students are studying in VBEMHS. It has two hostel playgrounds.

References

External links
Viswa Bharathi English iit olympiadschool

High schools and secondary schools in Andhra Pradesh
Schools in Krishna district
Educational institutions established in 1968
1968 establishments in Andhra Pradesh